The Railway Children is a 2000 drama television film based on the 1906 novel by E. Nesbit. It was broadcast for the first time in the United Kingdom on 23 April 2000 (which was Easter Sunday). Shortly afterwards, it was shown in the United States on the series Masterpiece Theatre.

Plot

Roberta (Bobbie), Peter and Phyllis live a comfortable and carefree upper middle-class life in London with their parents. But when their father (Michael Kitchen), a senior civil servant, is arrested on a charge of treason, found guilty, and imprisoned for life they are forced to move with their mother to Three Chimneys, a cold and run-down country cottage near a railway.

Whilst Mother (Jenny Agutter) tries to make a meagre living writing stories and poems she hopes magazines and newspapers will publish, the children seek amusement by watching the trains on the nearby railway line (the fictional Great Northern and Southern Railway) and waving to the passengers. They become friendly with Perks, the cheerful station porter, but feel the wrath of the stationmaster when Peter is caught trying to steal coal to heat the house. Occasionally the children quarrel, but they always call "pax" (a truce) and remain good-natured.

They become friends with an aristocratic old gentleman (whose name is never revealed) by waving to him on the 9:15 down train that he takes regularly. They ask him to assist them with food and medicine when their mother falls ill. He is happy to do so, although Mother is angry and humiliated.

The children save the lives of passengers on a train by alerting the driver to a landslide; they give shelter to a Russian dissident, Mr Szczepansky, and help to reunite him with his family. They rescue Jim (JJ Feild), a student  at a nearby boarding school, who is injured whilst taking part in a paper chase along the rail line.

Bobbie eventually discovers the truth of her father's absence, despite her mother's efforts to shield the children from it, and appeals to the old gentleman for help. As a director of the railway company with influential friends, he is able to help prove their father's innocence. The family is reunited.

There are hints of a possible future romance between Jim and Bobbie and the father takes over control of the railway from the old gentlemen.

Cast

Jemima Rooper as Bobbie
Jack Blumenau as Peter
Clare Thomas as Phyllis
Jenny Agutter as Mother
Richard Attenborough as The Old Gentleman
Gregor Fisher as Perks
Michael Kitchen as Father
David Bamber as Doctor Forrest
Melanie Clark Pullen as Ruth
Georgie Glen as Aunt Emma
Velibor Topić as Mr Szczepansky
Sophie Thompson as Mrs Perks 
JJ Feild as Jim
Clive Russell as The Station Master
Amanda Walker as Mrs Ransome

Filming locations and rolling stock

The area of England to which the family move is not specified, but the railway scenes were filmed on the Bluebell Railway. The railway was chosen because of the collection of period rolling stock and Sharpthorne Tunnel, which was seen as ideal for the tunnel scene.

The station used in the film was Horsted Keynes, which was featured heavily in a number of scenes. The landslide scene was filmed in the cutting near the Three-Arch Bridge, where a sliding section of embankment was placed on the bank in order to create the landslide.

As in the original film, a wide range of rolling stock was used. The locomotives seen are SECR C Class No. 592 (as the Green Dragon), NBR C Class No. 673 'Maude', LB&SCR E4 class No. 473 'Birch Grove' and LSWR B4 class No. 96 'Normandy'. No. 592 and Maude were painted in fictional liveries for the filming, with No. 592 wearing typical SECR lined green but with GNSR lettering, symbolising the fictional Great Northern and Southern Railway, and Maude in plain black with GNSR lettering. Birch Grove was seen sporting its original LB&SCR lined brown, and Normandy was painted in Southern Railway unlined black. Maude is based on the Bo'ness and Kinneil Railway near Edinburgh whilst the other locomotives remain on the Bluebell Railway. As of 2019, No. 592, Birch Grove (now painted SR Green and numbered B473), Maude and Normandy all await overhauls.

The carriages used in one rake during the film were Metropolitan Railway Full Third No. 394 and Brake Third No. 387 (both sporting lined varnish). These were joined in some scenes by the old gentleman's carriage, Great Northern Railway Director's Saloon No. 706 (also sporting lined varnish). The other carriage set was made up of LBSCR First Class No. 7598, SECR Hundred Seaters Nos. 971 and 1098, and SR Guards Van No. 404 (all painted in SR lined green). As of 2019, all of these carriages remain in use apart from No. 971, which is stored awaiting overhaul.

Home media 
The Railway Children was released on VHS and DVD in the UK by Carlton Video on 11 September 2000.

See also
 The Railway Children (1970 film)
 The Boxcar Children (2014 film)

Notes
Much of the advance publicity for the film focused on the casting of Jenny Agutter as Mother, thirty years on from her portrayal of elder daughter Bobbie in the 1970 film version - a role she had also played in the 1968 BBC Television adaptation, making this her third appearance in a version of the story.

External links
 .

British television films
Carlton Television
2000 television films
2000 films
Films based on British novels
Television series by ITV Studios
ITV television dramas
2000 drama films
Rail transport films
Films directed by Catherine Morshead